Czechoslovak armies in exile were the military formations loyal to the Czechoslovak government-in-exile during the German occupation of Czechoslovakia and included:
Poland
Czechoslovak Legion (1939), unit operating in Poland in 1939
United Kingdom
 Czechoslovak 11th Infantry Battalion, unit operating under British command from 1940 to 1942
1st Czechoslovak Armoured Brigade, unit operating under British command from 1943 to 1945
Czechoslovak RAF squadrons (310, 311, 312, and 313 Squadrons)
Soviet Union
 1st Czechoslovak Army Corps in the USSR 
 1st Czechoslovak Mixed Air Division

Czechoslovak government-in-exile